Frederiksø is a small island in the port of Svendborg, Denmark, which until 2001 housed Svendborg Skibsværft.

Islands of Denmark
Svendborg
Geography of Svendborg Municipality